Isapur Dam is an earthfill dam on Penganga river near Kalamnuri in the state of Maharashtra in India.

Specifications

Purpose
 Irrigation

How to Reach :
To reach Isapur we have to travel first to Shembalpimpri. Isapur is situated 4 km to the west of Shembalpimpri. To reach Shembalpimpri there are 3 different routes, 1. from Pusad (27 km) 2. From Umarkhed (30 km) and 3. From Hingoli (41 km).

Features of Isapur :
 One of the biggest dam in Maharashtra. This dam is ranked at 4th position having around 3.5 km long earthwall.
 Shembaleshwar temple is 1 km towards west of Shembalpimpri
 Anchuleshwar temple is around 6 km away from Isapur towards west of Isapur.

See also
 Arunawati Dam in Digras
 Upper Pus Dam in Pusad 
 Lower Pus Dam in Mahagaon
 Dams in Maharashtra
 List of reservoirs and dams in India

References

Dams in Nanded district
Dams completed in 1982
1982 establishments in Maharashtra